SMU/Mockingbird station (originally Mockingbird station) is a DART Light Rail station in Dallas, Texas. It is located at Mockingbird Lane and North Central Expressway (US 75) in North Dallas. It opened in January 1997 and is a station on the Blue, Red, and Orange Lines, serving the Mockingbird Station mixed-use development and nearby Southern Methodist University (SMU).

 It is also the northernmost DART station serving both the Red and Blue lines; from this point the lines diverge with the Red line heading north and the Blue line heading northeast.

From January 10, 1997 to September 27, 1999, SMU/Mockingbird station was Red Line only.

The station was renamed from Mockingbird station to SMU/Mockingbird Station on August 12, 2019, after SMU paid DART $463,000 for a 10-year naming rights agreement.

Surrounding development
Stairs, escalators and elevators connect the below-ground station to a ground-level outdoor mall, which was one of Texas' first modern transit-oriented developments, or TODs. The mall brought new life to the area, spurring more development around the station as years passed.

The mixed-use developments surrounding the station contain retail, restaurant, service, and entertainment options, along with office buildings and loft apartments. Events are held on a regular basis and are open to the public. DTZ manages the property and Madison Marquette manages leasing initiatives. (Cassidy Turley managed the property until it merged into the DTZ brand in January 2015.)

In a 2004 report, the Transportation Research Board called Mockingbird Station "a TOD success story," praising it for its location with "strong local demographics, and an abundance of adjacent regional attractions," and for being driven by private developers.

The station also connects to the University Crossing Trail, a largely grade-separated biking and walking trail oriented toward recreational and commute cycling.

References

External links 
 Dallas Area Rapid Transit - Mockingbird Station
 www.MockingbirdStation.com - the adjoining residential and retail development

Dallas Area Rapid Transit light rail stations in Dallas
Shopping malls in the Dallas–Fort Worth metroplex
Railway stations in the United States opened in 1997
1997 establishments in Texas
Railway stations in Texas at university and college campuses
Railway stations in Dallas County, Texas